Anastacia Brice is an American entrepreneur, business coach, and best known as the pioneer of the virtual assistance profession. She is the founder and chief visionary officer of AssistU, a Baltimore, Maryland-based organization committed to training, coaching, supporting, and certifying virtual assistants, and making referrals to the clients who want to work with them.

History and philosophy

In 1992, Brice moved out of the traditional employment world to establish a home-based business, providing travel planning and executive assistance. She subsequently began to formulate her vision of an archetypal administrative assistant; one who would work virtually using all available internet and more "usual" office technologies and who could, by virtue of the internet, work with clients who could be down the street or across the world.

In 1996, she became involved with Coach U, first as virtual assistant to then owner, Thomas J. Leonard, and shortly afterward, as student, learning to coach women to have and live deeply authentic lives. In early 1997, an article was published about her work as a virtual assistant in The Secretary (now OfficePro magazine), the trade publication of the International Association of Administrative Professionals.

In the spring of 1997, Brice created the virtual assistance profession by founding AssistU—an organization for virtual assistants, also known as VAs. It was designed to provide new virtual assistants with training, coaching, ongoing support through the life cycle of business, certification, community, and referrals to the members of the public who wanted to work with VAs.

Brice's virtual training program, a live, 20-week, intensive virtual training program that was offered from 1997 to 2011, contained more than 900 pages of training content, and was delivered via teleclass so that it could be available to anyone anywhere there was a phone. It incorporated a feminine business model created by Brice which held at its core solid business-building principles, as well as  inclusive support, teamwork, cooperation, collaboration, intuition, and a view to the long-term best interests of everyone involved.

In 2011, Brice revamped the training to offer it as a self-study program with one-on-one mentoring, designed to meet the ever changing needs and preferred styles of adult learners. That program is called the Virtual Mentoring Program.

Contributions and acknowledgments

Brice was awarded the VACOC InnoVAtive Award in 2006 and 2007 for her pioneering work and leadership in the field. She was also named the first recipient of the Thomas Leonard International Virtual Assistant of Distinction Award (2006), but was disqualified when she was unable to be present for the award ceremony.

In 2002, Brice was nominated for Fast Company Fast 50.

Brice is a past member of the board of directors of Women's U. She has served as the resident virtual work expert for the International Association of Solopreneurs. AllExperts.com, OfficePro magazine, and Westaff's Ask Carmen Courtesy.

Brice and AssistU in media

A frequent guest on talk radio shows such as Hayhouse Radio and Lifestyle CEO Internet Radio Show. Brice and AssistU have also been featured on MSNBC, and written about in numerous on-line and print publications such as Time, the Los Angeles Times, Inc. Magazine, BusinessWeek, Changing Course, Woman's Day, Entrepreneur, and The Wall Street Journal.

Her work with AssistU and on behalf of the virtual assistance profession has been written about in more than a dozen books, including the New York Times bestselling, Take Time for Your Life, and The 4-Hour Workweek.

In 2008, she was voted to the "Top 50 Tweeple to Follow" list, and in 2009, AssistU was a finalist in two categories for the Shorty Awards.

References

External links 
 
 AssistU

Living people
Distance education in the United States
Year of birth missing (living people)